Burlăceni is a commune in Cahul District, Moldova. It is composed of two villages, Burlăceni and Greceni.

It was established in 1919.

References

Communes of Cahul District